The 1965 IAAF World Race Walking Cup was held in Pescara, Italy, on October 9–10, 1965.  The event was also known as Lugano Trophy.

Complete results were published.

Medallists

Results

Men's 20 km

Men's 50 km

Team
The team rankings, named Lugano Trophy, combined the 20km and 50km events team results.

Participation
The participation of 42 athletes from 7 countries is reported.

 (6)
 (6)
 (6)
 (6)
 (6)
 (6)
 (6)

Qualifying rounds 
From 1961 to 1985 there were qualifying rounds with the winners proceeding to the final. This year, United Kingdom, Hungary, and Sweden proceeded directly to the final.

Zone 1
Frankfurt am Main, Federal Republic of Germany, August 22

Zone 2
La Chaux-de-Fonds, Switzerland, August 14/15

Zone 3
San Remo, Italy, September 19

Zone 4
Potsdam, German Democratic Republic, September 19

References

World Athletics Race Walking Team Championships
World Race Walking Cup
International athletics competitions hosted by Italy
World Race Walking Cup